The following is a list of the power stations in Bahrain.

Oil

Gas

References

Bahrain
Power stations